The Swain School of Design (also known as Swain Free School) was an American non-profit educational institution, founded in 1881 in New Bedford, Massachusetts. The school and archive is now part of the University of Massachusetts Dartmouth, within the College of Visual and Performing Arts and the Claire T. Carney Library.

History 
Swain began as the "Swain Free School" of New Bedford, Massachusetts in 1881 through the provisions of the estate of New Bedford philanthropist William W. Swain (1793–1858). The following year, the school began offering courses in languages, literature, history, education, art, and chemistry free of charge to area residents who could not otherwise afford an education beyond public school. The residents were required to put down a deposit of $10 per semester as a measure of good faith. As the textile industry was increasingly important to the area, the school concentrated on instruction in textile design.

In 1902, the trustees redefined the school mission as a, "School of Design".

In the 1970s, there were only 100 students enrolled at any time

The May 1970 commencement was a milestone for the school when twelve students earned their Bachelor of Fine Arts degrees, the first in Swain's history.

Notable faculty of Swain School of Design has included David Loeffler Smith, John Osbourne, Severin Haines, Dick Dougherty, Russell Daly, Alphonse Mattia, Jacqueline Block, Benjamin Martinez, Jim Bobrick, Tom Corey, Nicolas Kilmer, Robin Taffler, Leo Kelly, and Marc St. Pierre.

Merger with Southeastern Massachusetts University

In 1988, the Swain School in New Bedford merged with Southeastern Massachusetts University's College of Visual and Performing Arts. The campus at 1213 Purchase Street was leased by the University from the City of New Bedford until 2001; all other Swain buildings were sold.

In 1991, a new University of Massachusetts structure combined the Amherst, Boston, and Worcester campuses with the Southeastern Massachusetts University and the University of Lowell to form the University of Massachusetts system. Southeastern Massachusetts University (SMU) was renamed UMass at Dartmouth.

References 

 
 
 

University of Massachusetts Dartmouth
Defunct private universities and colleges in Massachusetts
Educational institutions established in 1881
1881 establishments in Massachusetts